The Concepción Bank (Spanish: Banco Concepción) is a seamount located in the Atlantic Ocean, part of the Canary Islands Seamount Province (CISP).

Located  to the North-East of the Canarian Island of Lanzarote, it is the largest (in terms of surface) seamount of the CISP. Rising  m over the sea bed, it reaches a minimum depth of  m below sea level.

References

Bibliography 
 

Seamounts of the Atlantic Ocean